is a town located in Chikujō, Fukuoka Prefecture, Japan.

The town was founded on October 11, 2005, by the merger of the villages of Shin'yoshitomi and Taihei, all from Chikujō District.

As of October 1 2016, the town has an estimated population of 7,382. The total area is 62.40 km².

References

External links

Kōge official website 

Towns in Fukuoka Prefecture